Double bugg is a Swedish swing dance.

Dance detail
Double bugg is more or less a competitive dance within the BRR dance family administered by the Swedish Dancesport Federation. The dance style has its background in another typical and invented Swedish dance style, namely Bugg. Bugg comes originally from Lindy Hop (Jitterbug).

Double bugg is danced by three persons, especially a gentleman and two women. Variations occur however. Double bugg is mostly performered on dance competitions, but sometimes also occurred among social dancers. The dance arose during the 80s and was due to deficiency on gentlemen wanted to dance. One found out that a gentleman could dance the Swedish partner dance Bugg with two women concurrent. Suddenly a new dance style in Sweden was invented, double bugg.

Today double bugg is a small formation dance, that is conducted of three persons. The formation of different patterns and formations, for example lines, circles, triangles are apart from changing place between the dancers, one of several main features in double bugg. The character is free and is retrieved from someone of the other Swedish BRR dances: Bugg, Lindy Hop, Boogie Woogie and Rock and Roll (dance). A various footwear is preferred in double bugg and is mainly danced to modern pop or rock'n'roll music.

External links
 Swedish Dancesport Federation (DSF)
 World Rock'n'Roll Confederation (WRRC)

Dance in Sweden
Swedish culture